Richard Earl Trapp (born September 21, 1946) is an American former college and professional football player who was a wide receiver in the American Football League (AFL) for two seasons during the late 1960s.  Trapp played college football for the University of Florida, and thereafter, played professionally for the Buffalo Bills and San Diego Chargers of the AFL.

Early years 

He was born in Lynwood, California.  Trapp attended Manatee High School in Bradenton, Florida, where he was a standout high school football player for the Manatee Hurricanes.

College career 

Trapp accepted an athletic scholarship to attend the University of Florida in Gainesville, Florida, where he played for coach Ray Graves' Florida Gators football team from 1965 to 1967.  In three seasons as a starting wide receiver for the Gators, he totaled 1,783 receiving yards, and compiled eight games in which he caught passes for 100 yards or more.  In 1966 he caught passes for 148 yards against the Auburn Tigers, and 150 yards against the Ole Miss Rebels; in 1967, he compiled 171 receiving yards against the Georgia Bulldogs.  Trapp was a first-team All-Southeastern Conference (SEC) selection in 1966 and 1967, and the recipient of the Gators' Fergie Ferguson Award in 1967.  He also played for coach Dave Fuller's Florida Gators baseball team in 1967 and 1968.

Trapp graduated from the University of Florida with a bachelor's degree in 1969, and a J.D. degree in 1974, and he was later inducted into the University of Florida Athletic Hall of Fame.

Professional career 

The Buffalo Bills selected Trapp in the third round (83rd pick overall) of the 1968 combined draft, and he played for the Bills during the  season.  During his one year with the Bills, he played in all 14 games, catching 24 passes for 235 yards.  During his second season, he saw limited action with the San Diego Chargers in eight games.  He finished his professional football career with 26 receptions for 274 yards.

Life after football 

Trapp is a practicing attorney in Orlando, Florida. His son Jackson Trapp played college basketball at Florida Atlantic University and later in the professional ranks.

See also 

 Florida Gators football, 1960–69
 List of Florida Gators in the NFL Draft
 List of Levin College of Law graduates
 List of University of Florida alumni
 University of Florida Athletic Hall of Fame

Bibliography 

 Carlson, Norm, University of Florida Football Vault: The History of the Florida Gators, Whitman Publishing, LLC, Atlanta, Georgia (2007).  .
 Golenbock, Peter, Go Gators!  An Oral History of Florida's Pursuit of Gridiron Glory, Legends Publishing, LLC, St. Petersburg, Florida (2002).  .
 Hairston, Jack, Tales from the Gator Swamp: A Collection of the Greatest Gator Stories Ever Told, Sports Publishing, LLC, Champaign, Illinois (2002).  .
 McCarthy, Kevin M.,  Fightin' Gators: A History of University of Florida Football, Arcadia Publishing, Mount Pleasant, South Carolina (2000).  .
 McEwen, Tom, The Gators: A Story of Florida Football, The Strode Publishers, Huntsville, Alabama (1974).  .
 Nash, Noel, ed., The Gainesville Sun Presents The Greatest Moments in Florida Gators Football, Sports Publishing, Inc., Champaign, Illinois (1998).  .

References 

1946 births
Living people
People from Lynwood, California
Sportspeople from Los Angeles County, California
Players of American football from California
American football wide receivers
Florida Gators football players
Fredric G. Levin College of Law alumni
Buffalo Bills players
San Diego Chargers players
Baseball players from California
Florida Gators baseball players
Florida Blazers players